Pseudagrion ignifer is a species of damselfly in the family Coenagrionidae,
commonly known as a flame-headed riverdamsel. 
It is a medium-sized damselfly with an orange face and pruinose sides to its body and the start of its tail.
It is found in eastern Australia, where it inhabits streams.

Gallery

See also
 List of Odonata species of Australia

References 

Coenagrionidae
Odonata of Australia
Insects of Australia
Taxa named by Robert John Tillyard
Insects described in 1906
Damselflies